Linda Vista Community Hospital is a former hospital located at 610-30 South St. Louis Street in Los Angeles, California, United States, in the Boyle Heights neighborhood. The hospital was originally constructed for employees of the Santa Fe Railroad and called the Santa Fe Coast Lines Hospital. It was one of four employee hospitals run by the railroad Santa Fe Employees Hospital Association. 

The hospital closed in 1991. After its closure, the hospital became a popular filming location for productions, including films, TV shows, and music videos. It has also become the subject of several paranormal investigations. The hospital was sold in 2011 and converted into a low income senior living facility called Hollenbeck Terrace.

History 

The original building that housed the hospital opened in the fall of 1905 to serve employees of the Santa Fe Railroad. It had its own Jersey cows, chickens, and a garden to provide patients with the freshest milk, butter, eggs, poultry and vegetables. This original Moorish-style hospital building was designed by Charles Whittlesey and known as the Santa Fe Coast Lines Hospital. The hospital was so successful that it began expanding and the location, overlooking Hollenbeck Park was transformed into a campus.

The original 1905 building was replaced in 1938 with the current Mission Revival Style structure, designed by architect H.L. Gilman. In 1985 it became the Linda Vista Community Hospital.

Decline and closure 
By the late 1970s, the railroad hospital association facilities were experiencing declining use, as more railroad workers began to use conventional medical-insurance policies. The area surrounding the hospital also became a less-affluent area, severely affecting the hospital financially. The Santa Fe Railroad sold the 150-bed hospital to American Healthcare Management in 1980. According to a California Health Law News report, Linda Vista was forced to reduce operational expenses in the form of limiting whole services and as a result saw much blame for mistreatment of patients and a noticeable decline in quality. As the hospital cut operational costs, more hospital staff and patients began transferring out to more affluent hospitals in the area as a result. During the 1970s and 1980s, the hospital spent most of the time treating victims of gang-related violence in the nearby area as crime had risen dramatically around Boyle Heights. Making matters worse for the hospital, a majority of the victims were either underinsured or uninsured, contributing to financial difficulties. Following public criticism noted in an LA times article in 1988, system mismanagement eventually forced the hospital to close its emergency services department in 1989. The quality of care at Linda Vista Community Hospital continued to decline as doctors and nurses moved to other hospitals. In 1991, the hospital ceased operations.

Post-closure
In the decades following its closure, the building became the center of several paranormal investigations; the most notable investigation was initiated by Ghost Adventures, where the crew stayed a full night in the hospital. During that time, it was used primarily as a filming location. In January 2006, the hospital was placed on the National Register of Historic Places.

In 2011, the 4.2-acre Linda Vista Hospital complex was purchased by AMCAL Multi-Housing Inc. The structures on the historic registry, the main hospital and former nurses dormitory, were renovated into Hollenbeck Terrace and now provide a total of 97 apartments for fixed-income seniors plus a medical facility.

As a filming location
Notable works shot at Linda Vista include the following:

Films
To Live and Die in L.A. (1985)
Fatal Beauty (1987)
In the Line of Fire (1992)
Addams Family Values(1993)
Outbreak (1995)
Suicide Kings (1997)
L.A. Confidential (1997)
Conspiracy Theory (1997)
Children of the Corn 666: Isaac's Return (1999)
End of Days (1999)
The Cell (2000)
Pearl Harbor (2001)
The Longest Yard (2005)
Boo (2005)
Day of the Dead 2: Contagium (2005)
Room 6 (2006)
The Gene Generation (2007)
Deadgirl (2008)
Zombie Strippers (2008)
The Lords of Salem (2012)
Killjoy Goes to Hell (2012)
Rift (2012)
Greystone Park (2012)
Los Muertos (2013)
Insidious: Chapter 2 (2013)
Insidious: Chapter 3 (2015)

Television programs

The pilot episode of ER
Buffy the Vampire Slayer
The fifth episode of Charm School with Ricki Lake, where the contestants had to "face their fears" by doing various tasks in the hospital & also make money towards a charity.
The Travel Channel's Ghost Adventures
Charmed (Season 1, Episode 5: "Dream Sorcerer")
Dexter (Season 1, Episode 4: "Let's Give the Boy a Hand")
True Blood (Season 5) in the episode "Let's Boot and Rally"
Criminal Minds (Season 7) in the episode "Heathridge Manor"
House Calls (TV series)
 L.A. 7 (the Art College Bradley works at in the episode "Working"
 Young Sheldon (the hospital where George Cooper Sr is taken when he has a mild heart attack in the episode "Poker, Faith and Eggs" (9 November 2017)
 The Colony (The hospital in which the members went to scavenge medical supplies for survival.)
 Rob Dyrdek's Fantasy Factory (Season 5, Episode 10 Titled "Dyrdek Day") 

Music videos
The Duran Duran song "Falling Down"
The Fall Out Boy song “Where Did the Party Go” 
The Garbage song "Bleed Like Me"
The Used song "Blood on My Hands"
The Avenged Sevenfold song "Nightmare"
The Girlicious song "Maniac"
The In This Moment song "Adrenalize"
The Rise Against song "Hero of War"
The We Are the In Crowd song "Rumor Mill" on the album Best Intentions
The Foo Fighters song "Best of You"
The Hollywood Undead song "We Are"
The Otep song "Apex Predator"
The Paramore song "Monster"
The Lumineers song "Ho Hey"
The Neon Trees song “Lessons in Love (All Day All Night”
The New Found Glory song “Radiosurgery”
The Disturbed song "Stupify"
The Nine Inch Nails song "Closer"

See also
Los Angeles Historic-Cultural Monuments on the East and Northeast Sides
National Register of Historic Places listings in Los Angeles
St Luke Medical Center
Lawang Sewu

References

"AMCAL California Bond Application request, #11-159"
"Boyle Heights’ haunted hospital to be turned into senior housing, Dec 22,2011"
"Calif Health Law News - California's Vanishing Community Hospital: An Endangered Institution"

External links

Hollenbeck Terrace website

Hospital buildings completed in 1924
Defunct hospitals in California
Hospitals in Los Angeles
Hospitals disestablished in 1991
Buildings and structures on the National Register of Historic Places in Los Angeles
Buildings of the Atchison, Topeka and Santa Fe Railway
Reportedly haunted locations in Los Angeles
Boyle Heights, Los Angeles